The Científicos (Spanish: "scientists" or "those scientifically oriented") were a circle of technocratic advisors to President of Mexico Porfirio Díaz.
Steeped in the positivist "scientific politics", they functioned as part of his program of modernization at the start of the 20th century.

Leading Científicos included:
 Gabino Barreda (1820–1881), a precursor of the group. A physician and professor of medicine, Barreda studied in Paris under Auguste Comte between 1847 and 1851 and is widely credited with introducing positivism in Mexico. Put in charge of fulfilling the 1857 Constitution's promise of secular public education by the early Juárez government, Barreda organized the National Preparatory School, the first secular school of higher learning in Mexico, which opened in 1868 and became the training ground for many of the younger Científicos.
 Manuel Romero Rubio (1828–1895), Secretary of the Interior from 1884 to 1895 was founding member of the group, and its original leader and protector. With his death, Limantour –his political protégé– commenced to direct the Científicos. He also was the father in law of Porfirio Díaz.
 José Yves Limantour (1854–1935), Ministro de Hacienda (Secretary of the Treasury) from 1893 until the fall of the Díaz regime in 1911; considered the political leader of the faction.
 Justo Sierra, the leading intellectual and spokesman of the circle.
 The writers and journalists Francisco Bulnes (1847–1924) and Emilio Rabasa (1856–1930), co-founders of the newspaper El Universal (in 1888), both considered spokesmen for the Científicos.
 Enrique Creel (1854–1931), a wealthy businessman and landowner, an influential member of the powerful Creel-Terrazas Family that dominated the northern state of Chihuahua, of which he was governor from 1904 until the fall of the Díaz regime in 1911.
Luis Terrazas (1829–1923), Founder of the Creel-Terrazas Family, father-in-law of Enrique Creel, and one of the richest landowners in the Republic of Mexico; he helped to bankroll the faction.
 The lawyers Pablo Macedo and Joaquín Casasús.
Antonio V. Hernández Benavides, co-founder of the Banco Central Mexicano, senator and interim governor of Coahuila, uncle to president Francisco I. Madero.
 Nemesio García Naranjo (1883–1963), who later became Secretary of Education under Victoriano Huerta in 1913.
 Emilio Pimentel, lawyer, governor of Oaxaca from 1902 to 1911.
 Rosendo Pineda, lawyer, influential backer of Porfirio Díaz in the state of Oaxaca.
 Rafael Reyes Spíndola (1860–1922), founder (in 1896) and publisher of the Mexico City newspaper El Imparcial, considered the "semi-official newspaper of the Porfiriato."

There were other factions within the Díaz government that were opposed to the Científicos, most notably that led by former general Bernardo Reyes.

See also

Liberalism in Mexico
Porfiriato
Porfirio Díaz

References

Sources
 Hernández Chávez, Alicia. Mexico: A Brief History. (Berkeley: University of California Press, 2006), p. 194.
 Ruiz, Ramón Eduardo. Triumphs and Tragedy: A History of the Mexican People (New York: Norton, 1992), p. 274
 Martínez Vázquez, Víctor Raúl, editor. La revolución en Oaxaca, 1900-1930, p. 38.

Further reading

De María y Campos, Alfonso. "Porfirianos prominentes: origenes y años de juventud de ocho integrantes del group de los Científicos 1846-1876", Historia Mexicana 30 (1985), pp. 610–81.
González Navarro, Moisés. "Las ideas raciales de los Científicos". Historia Mexicana 37 (1988) pp. 575–83.
Hale, Charles A. Justo Sierra. Un liberal del Porfiriato. Mexico: Fondo de Cultura Económica 1997.
Hale, Charles A. The Transformation of Liberalism in Late Nineteenth-Century Mexico. Princeton: Princeton University Press 1989.
Priego, Natalia. Positivism, Science, and 'The Scientists' in Porfirian Mexico. Liverpool: Liverpool University Press 2016.
Raat, William. "The Antiposivitist Movement in Pre-Revolutionary Mexico, 1892-1911", Journal of Inter-American Studies and World Affairs, 19 (1977) pp. 83–98.
Raat, William. "Los intelectuales, el Positivismo y la cuestión indígena". Historia Mexicana 20 (1971), pp. 412–27.
Villegas, Abelardo. Positivismo y Porfirismo. Mexico: Secreatria de Educación Pública, Col Sepsetentas 1972.
Zea, Leopoldo, El Positivismo en México. Nacimiento apogeo y decadenica. Mexico: Fondo de Cultura Económica 1968.

Porfiriato
Government of Mexico
Liberalism in Mexico